Aldisa smaragdina is a species of sea slug, a dorid nudibranch, a marine gastropod mollusk in the family Cadlinidae.

Distribution 
This species was described from the Canary Islands. It has subsequently been reported from the Atlantic coast of Spain and from Portugal.

Description
This species has raised rounded tubercles covering the dorsum. There are two round markings on the back which are darker in colour. The animal grows to 30 mm in length.

Ecology
This nudibranch feeds on the hymedesmiid sponge Phorbas fictitius ( aka Anchinoe fictitius). The two darker round markings on the back of the animal closely resemble the inhalant pore sieves of Phorbas, providing excellent camouflage. A progesterone homologue has been isolated from this species.

References

Cadlinidae
Gastropods described in 1982